Mark Heffron (born 18 November 1991) is an English professional boxer who challenged for the British middleweight title in 2018. As an amateur he won a silver medal at the 2009 European Youth Championships.

Professional career
Heffron made his professional debut on 4 September 2010, scoring a second-round knockout (KO) victory against Torsten Roos at the Bekkerveld Festival in Heerlen, Netherlands.

After compiling a record of 19–0 (15 KOs), he defeated Andrew Robinson via sixth-round technical knockout (TKO) on 9 June 2018 at the Manchester Arena, capturing the vacant WBC International middleweight title. The bout served as part of the undercard for Tyson Fury's comeback fight against Sefer Seferi.

Following a fourth-round TKO victory against Aryee Ayittey in October, Heffron returned to the Manchester Arena to face former British super-welterweight champion Liam Williams for the vacant British middleweight title on 22 December, serving as part of the undercard for Josh Warrington's world title defence against Carl Frampton. After nine rounds of action Heffron was well behind on the scorecards. In the tenth, he was caught with a punch which prompted Williams to launch a sustained attack and force referee Howard Foster to issue a standing eight count. The fight resumed, only to be stopped moments later after Heffron was again on the receiving end of a barrage of punches, prompting Foster to call a halt to the contest to hand Heffron the first defeat of his career via tenth-round TKO.

Professional boxing record

References

External links

Living people
1991 births
English male boxers
Sportspeople from Oldham
Middleweight boxers
Super-middleweight boxers